William Kendall Denison (May 17, 1869 Irasburg, Vermont - ?) was an American classicist, and educator.

He graduated from Tufts College in 1891, and Harvard College with an AM in 1892.  He taught at Tufts College. 
He was an executive committee member of the Archaeological Institute of America.

He married Florence Howland in 1904; they had three children.

Awards
1896 Rome Prize

References

Tufts University alumni
Harvard College alumni
Tufts University faculty
1869 births
Year of death missing